Ray Thompson may refer to:

Ray Thompson (rugby league) (born 1990), Australian rugby league player
Ray Thompson (politician), former North Dakota state treasurer, see Political party strength in North Dakota
Raymond Thompson (born 1949), screenwriter and composer
Raymond Thompson (swimmer) (1911–1999), American freestyle swimmer
Ray Thompson, sidekick to the Justice Guild of America
Raymond Thompson (priest) (born 1942), Dean of Clogher, 2005–2009
Raymond H. Thompson, professor and Arthurian scholar
Raymond Thompson (luger) (born 1989), British luger